Charles of Bourbon Visiting Pope Benedict XIV at the Coffee House del Quirinale is a painting by Giovanni Paolo Pannini, commissioned by Charles of Bourbon in 1746 and completed the same year. It showed and commemorated Charles' visit to Rome after the Bourbon victory over the Austrians at the Battle of Velletri in 1744 - he and pope Benedict XIV were already friends and had signed a Concordat in 1741.

It originally hung in the Capodimonte Palace in Naples and in 1806 was moved to the Palazzo degli Studi. Just before Allied troops arrived in Naples, German soldiers of the Hermann Goering Division took the painting and presented it to the Italian Social Republic. It was returned to Naples after the war to join the collection of the National Museum of Capodimonte, where it still hangs with its pair Charles of Bourbon Visiting St Peter's Basilica.

Bibliography
Antonio Spinosa, Salò, una storia per immagini, Segrate, Arnoldo Mondadori Editore, 1992. 
Mario Sapio, Il Museo di Capodimonte, Napoli, Arte'm, 2012. 
Touring Club Italiano, Museo di Capodimonte, Milano, Touring Club Editore, 2012. 

1746 paintings
History paintings
Paintings in the collection of the Museo di Capodimonte
Paintings by Giovanni Paolo Panini
Cultural depictions of Spanish kings
Cultural depictions of religious leaders